The Gimpo Bridge crosses the Han River, South Korea and connects the cities of Gimpo and Goyang. The bridge is a part of the Seoul Ring Expressway.

References

See also 
 Transportation in South Korea
 List of bridges in South Korea

Bridges in Gyeonggi Province
Bridges completed in 1997
Buildings and structures in Goyang
Buildings and structures in Gimpo